Shelter from the Night is the tenth studio album by American country pop group Exile. It was released in 1987 via Epic Records. The includes the singles "I Can't Get Close Enough", "Feel Like Foolin' Around", "Just One Kiss" and "It's You Again".

Track listing

Chart performance

References

1987 albums
Exile (American band) albums
Epic Records albums